Balantiopteryx is a genus of sac-winged bats. It comprises three species:
Ecuadorian sac-winged bat - B. infusca
Thomas's sac-winged bat - B. io 
Gray sac-winged bat  - B. plicata

References

External links
IUCN Red List entry

 
Bat genera
Taxa named by Wilhelm Peters